is an island in the Sea of Japan.

Awashima is administratively the village of Awashimaura under Iwafune District of Niigata Prefecture. , the island's population is 353.

History
Awashima has been inhabited since at least the Jōmon period, as archaeologists have found Jōmon period pottery shards in five locations on the islands east coast. However, no evidence of inhabitation from the Yayoi period or the Kofun period has yet been discovered. The name of the island first appears in a verse in the Nara period Man'yōshū poetry anthology, at which time the island was on the frontier of the Yamato state with the Emishi. The Matsura clan of northern Kyushu, noted pirates and sea traders,  began to occupy the eastern shore of the island from the 9th century, gradually pushing the Emishi out. During the Edo period, the island passed between Murakami Domain, Shonai Domain and direct control by the Tokugawa Shogunate several times. During the Boshin War, the Schnell brothers offloaded weapons for Shonai Domain at Awashima. After the Meiji restoration, the village of Asahimaura was created in 1909 as part of Iwafune, District, Niigata Prefecture. The epicentre of the 1964 Niigata earthquake was near Awashima.

Climate

Important Bird Area
The island has been recognised as an Important Bird Area (IBA) by BirdLife International because it supports a large breeding colony of streaked shearwaters.

Minor Planet
A minor planet 13039 Awashima has been named after the island.

See also 
 List of islands of Japan

Notes

References
 Teikoku's Complete Atlas of Japan, Teikoku-Shoin., Ltd. Tokyo 1990,

External links

 Awashimaura Village Official Website

Islands of the Sea of Japan
Islands of Niigata Prefecture
Important Bird Areas of Japan
Seabird colonies